In the Chicago mayoral election of 1849, incumbent James H. Woodworth was reelected in a landslide.

This election made Woodworth the first Chicago mayor to be successfully reelected to a second consecutive term (an accolade that would have belonged to Augustus Garrett had the results of the March 1844 Chicago mayoral election not been declared null). Woodworth was also only the third mayor to be elected to a second term, after only Benjamin Wright Raymond and Augustus Garrett.

Campaign
The election is notable for the lack of political party involvement. With the major national political parties disintegrating over the national debate surrounding slavery, the 1849 mayoral campaign lacked party conventions to nominate candidates. Instead, candidates were self-nominated. There was also a lack of party-organized efforts to support any candidate.

Results

References

Mayoral elections in Chicago
Chicago
Chicago
1840s in Chicago